The Heirs of Anthony Boucher is a book written by Marvin Lachman and published by Poisoned Pen Press on 1 August 2005, which later went on to win the Anthony Award for Best Critical Nonfiction in 2006.

References 

Anthony Award-winning works
American mystery novels
Anthony Boucher
Poisoned Pen Press books
2005 American novels